The 2019 IHF North American and Caribbean Emerging Nations Championship was the first edition of the IHF North American and Caribbean Emerging Nations Championship held in the Dominican Republic under the aegis of International Handball Federation. The tournament was held in Santo Domingo from 8 to 14 April 2019. The winner qualified for the 2019 IHF Emerging Nations Championship held in Georgia from June 8 to 16 2019.

A total of 12 countries participate in the tournament.

Venues
All games are played at the Pabellon de Balomano in Santo Domingo.

Participating teams

Draw
The draw was held on 25 March 2019.

Seeding

Draw Procedure
1. Teams in pot 3 are drawn to groups A to D in row 3.

2. Teams in pot 2 are drawn to groups A to D in row 2.

3. Organizer has the prerogative to assign itself to a group of its choice in row 1.

4. The remaining teams in pot 1 are drawn to groups A to D in row 1.

Result

Referees
The following referees were appointed for the championship:

Preliminary round
All times are local (UTC–4).

Group A

Group B

Group C

Group D

Final Round

9th–12th place

Championship bracket

Quarterfinals

5–8th place semifinals

Semifinals

Seventh place game

Fifth place game

Third place game

Final

Final standings

References 

IHF North America
IHF North America
IHF North American and Caribbean Emerging Nations
IHF North American and Caribbean Emerging Nations Championship
International handball competitions hosted by the Dominican Republic
North America and Caribbean Handball Confederation competitions